He Junquan is a Chinese swimmer and multiple Paralympic gold medallist.

He represented China at the 2000 Summer Paralympics, winning a bronze medal, a gold and a silver. Competing again at the 2004 Paralympics, he won four gold medals. He is representing China again at the 2008 Summer Paralympics. In his favorite event, the 50 m backstroke, he earned a silver, "outtouched" 0.15 seconds by Brazilian Daniel Dias. His first gold came in 4X50m freestyle where China set a world record with a time of 2 mins 18.15 secs. A second world record and gold followed in the Men's 4 x 50m Medley 20pts. He also competed at the 2012 Summer Paralympics in London,  winning a second silver in the 50m backstroke S5, and later a bronze in the 50m butterfly S5.

He Junquan has no arms. He has stated that, having to hit the edge of the pool with his head to stop the chronometre, he frequently scratches his scalp and hurts his back and neck.

Reporting on the competition at the 2008 Games, Will Swanton of the Sydney Morning Herald wrote:
"The Water Cube has been a sight for sore eyes. China's He Junquan, with no arms, was leading the 50m backstroke final. He approached the wall with a narrow lead. Every person in the stadium who had feet was on them. There was an almighty din, red Chinese flags everywhere. He came to the finish - and had to crash into the wall with his head. As He slowed down to lessen the impact, Brazilian Daniel Dias hit the wall first with an outstretched hand. You've never heard a silence like it.
Presented with his silver medal and flowers at the presentation ceremony, He put the flowers between his teeth and bowed."

References

External links
 

Paralympic swimmers of China
Swimmers at the 2000 Summer Paralympics
Swimmers at the 2004 Summer Paralympics
Swimmers at the 2008 Summer Paralympics
Paralympic gold medalists for China
Paralympic silver medalists for China
Paralympic bronze medalists for China
Living people
World record holders in paralympic swimming
Chinese amputees
Medalists at the 2000 Summer Paralympics
Medalists at the 2004 Summer Paralympics
Medalists at the 2008 Summer Paralympics
Medalists at the 2012 Summer Paralympics
S5-classified Paralympic swimmers
Year of birth missing (living people)
Paralympic medalists in swimming
Chinese male backstroke swimmers
Chinese male butterfly swimmers
21st-century Chinese people